Gymnasium Philippinum or Philippinum High School is an almost 500-year-old secondary school in Marburg, Hesse, Germany.

History 
The Gymnasium Philippinum was founded in 1527 as a Protestant school based at the same time with the University of Marburg (Marburger University) created by Philipp I of Hesse. The goal of the Gymnasium Philippinum was, above all, to provide young students with the knowledge of Latin and Greek they required. Only in 1833 did the Gymnasium Philippinum attain independence from the University of Marburg. After 1866, it became a royal-Prussian High School. In 1868, the school was moved into a gothic building in the Untergasse. In 1904, it received its current name, in honor of the school's founder on his 400th birthday.

In 1953 co-education was introduced to the former boys school. In 1969, the school moved into a new building on Leopold Lucas road, opposite the Elizabeth school (Elisabethschule).

Philippinum today 
Since 2003, the Gymnasium Philippinum has become an all-day school. In 2006, the school term was shortened to eight school years. A special emphasis of Philippinum is music instruction with musical support from early on and an achievement course in music in the upper stage. The humanistic tradition of Philippinum continues in its foreign language instruction, with Latin and English beginning in the fifth year of education.

Notable teachers 
 August Friedrich Christian Vilmar (1833-1850)

Notable alumni 
 Johannes Althusius (16th century)
 Otto Ubbelohde (1875-1884)
 Bruno Strauss (1899-1906)
 Erwin Piscator (1903-1907)
 Carl Joachim Friedrich (1911-1919)
 Leo Strauss (1912-1917)
 Christoph Heubner (1960s)
 Ingrid Arndt-Brauer (1970s)
 Henning Rübsam (1980s)

References 
 '' High School Philippinum 1527–1977. Anniversary publication to the 450-Year Festival. Hg.v. Albrecht H., Marburg 1977.

External links 
 

Gymnasiums in Germany
Schools in Hesse
Marburg
1527 establishments in the Holy Roman Empire
Educational institutions established in the 1520s